Ortigas Center is a central business district located within the joint boundaries of Pasig, Mandaluyong and Quezon City, within the Metro Manila region in the Philippines. It is governed by Ortigas Center Association, Inc.

Ortigas Center is home to many shopping malls, office and condominium skyscrapers, nightlife bars, restaurants and other building complexes. These include the St. Francis Square, the Asian Development Bank compound, the Oakwood Premier serviced apartments and a Shangri-La hotel. It is also the headquarters of San Miguel Corporation, Jollibee Foods Corporation, Viva Communications, Century Pacific Food, the Philippine branch of HSBC, Republic Biscuit Corporation (Rebisco), and Robinsons Galleria. Also present in the area are Philippine offices of prominent engineering firms such as Parsons Brinckerhoff, Sinclair Knight Merz, and WSP Group.

It is also home to the Banco de Oro main office owned by mall tycoon Henry Sy, Sr., as is the SM Megamall he owns—one of the largest malls in the nation—along EDSA. Also located near the Ortigas Center is The Medical City, one of the three hospitals in the nation accredited by the Joint Commission on International Accreditation. Ortigas Center is surrounded by Ortigas Avenue to the north, EDSA to the west, Meralco Avenue to the east, and Shaw Boulevard to the south.

History
Ortigas Center began as the  "Hacienda de Mandaloyon", an estate from the Augustinian Order that spanned the present-day cities of San Juan, Mandaluyong, Quezon City, and Pasig. On January 20, 1920, the Augustinian friars sold this property to Dr. Frank W. Dudley and Don Francisco Ortigas. Dudley later surrendered his interest to Phil C. Whitaker, and the company became known as Whitaker and Ortigas. In the following years, there were several changes of partners. Then, on July 10, 1931, the company was incorporated as "Ortigas, Madrigal y cia., S. en C." as a limited partnership by shares. The parties to the partnership were Francisco Ortigas (Don Paco), Vicente Madrigal, B.C.M. Johnston, Fulgencio Borromeo, Clyde A. Dewitt and future President Manuel L. Quezon.

When Ortigas & Company acquired the estate, it was a virtual wasteland. The vision of the management, headed by Atty. Francisco Ortigas Jr., who was president and chairman at that time, turned it into a progressive industrial, commercial and residential urban complex.

It would only take until the 1960s for development to begin in the district with the building of the first structures.

Districts

North Side
The northern portion of the area is part of Quezon City. It is situated south of Ugong Norte. The EDSA Shrine and Robinsons Galleria is situated here. Robinsons Galleria is a mixed-use complex composed of two high-rise office towers namely the Galleria Corporate Center and the Robinsons Equitable Tower, the Holiday Inn Manila Ortigas and Crowne Plaza Manila Galleria, the Galleria Regency and a 5-level shopping mall. Before Robinsons Galleria, this mall used to be an open land owned by SSS within Ortigas Center. In 1986, they used the land for the People Power Revolution. In 1987, John Gokongwei bought the large portion of the land from SSS. It started construction on mid-1988 and finished on late-1989. The mall opened in 1990 being the first mall of Robinsons Malls. Buildings like the UnionBank Plaza, Marco Polo Ortigas Manila, The Robinsons Cyberscape, The Orient Square, The Joy-Nostalg Center, The Meralco Theater are located here, as well as the Famous EDSA Shrine.

West Side
The western portion of Ortigas Center is part of Mandaluyong. It is in the eastern side of Barangay Wack-Wack Greenhills. Mandaluyong is known for being the "Shopping Capital of the Philippines" because it is home to a cluster of shopping centers which stand side by side. This is where most of the shopping malls in the area located like SM Megamall, The Podium, Shangri-la Plaza Mall and St. Francis Square Mall. It is also proximity to nearby Robinsons Cybergate Center. The Asian Development Bank Headquarters, The Edsa Shangri-La, Manila, The One Shangri-La Place Towers, The St. Francis Shangri-La Place The Malayan Plaza, The Discovery Suites, and The BDO Corporate Center are also located here.

East Side
The eastern portion is part of Pasig and is where most of the Ortigas Center's skyscrapers are located. The whole place is politically known as Barangay San Antonio. It is where most of Pasig's financial resources are primarily concentrated. The barangay of San Antonio has the largest income in Pasig, second only to San Lorenzo Village of Makati as the largest single income-generated government unit in the Philippines. Buildings like The Benpres Building (including the Lopez Museum), One Corporate Centre, One San Miguel Avenue, Orient Square, Wynsum Corporate Plaza, as well as the Department of Education (Philippines) Headquarters, The Tektite Towers, houses the former trading floor of the Philippine Stock Exchange, Ayala Malls The 30th, The Octagon (Ortigas Center) and The Capitol Commons are located here.

The eastern extension areas of Ortigas Center are Ortigas East located at Barangay Ugong along C-5 Road and Capitol Commons located at Barangay Oranbo.

Corporate Headquarters
Local and Foreign Companies serve the CBD, such as the Amberland Corporation, Aventis Pharma,  Banco de Oro, Bank of Commerce, China State Construction Engineering Corp, Citibank, Digital Telecommunications Philippines, JG Summit Holdings and its affiliates (Robinsons Land Corporation, Robinsons Bank, and Robinsons Malls), Meralco, Neville Clarke Phils., PCCW, San Miguel Corporation, 7-Eleven, Sykes Enterprises, TÜV SÜD Phils, Inc., Union Bank of the Philippines, Callhounds Global BPO Corporation, Vertiv, VeriFone, Asia United Bank (AUB) and other companies.

Education
Among the universities and colleges situated within Ortigas are St. Paul College Pasig, University of Asia and the Pacific, and the Saint Pedro Poveda College. The Ateneo School of Medicine and Public Health of the Ateneo de Manila University is also located within the financial center. Lourdes School of Mandaluyong is among the secondary schools within Ortigas. MFI Polytechnic Institute which caters to technical and vocational courses can also be found in the financial center.

Buildings

One Shangri-La Place
The St. Francis Shangri-La Place 
BDO Corporate Center
UnionBank Plaza 
One Corporate Center, Ortigas, Pasig
St. Francis Square, Mandaluyong
Marco Polo Ortigas Manila, Pasig
Robinsons Equitable Tower, Pasig

References

External links
Ortigas & Company Limited Partnership - Ortigas & Company Limited Partnership Corporate Website

 
Districts in Metro Manila
Pasig
Mandaluyong
Quezon City
Central business districts in the Philippines
Economy of Metro Manila
Financial districts
Planned communities in the Philippines